Sefidkuh Rural District is a rural district (dehestan) in Samen District, Malayer County, Hamadan Province, Iran. At the 2006 census, its population was 5,234, in 1,331 families. The rural district has 9 villages.

References 

Rural Districts of Hamadan Province
Malayer County